Anna Zukal  (born 7 October 1985) is a Russian freestyle skier. She was born in Tashkent. She competed at the 2002 Winter Olympics, where she placed sixth in women's aerials. She also competed at the 2006 Winter Olympics.

References

External links 
 

1985 births
Sportspeople from Tashkent
Living people
Russian female freestyle skiers
Olympic freestyle skiers of Russia
Freestyle skiers at the 2002 Winter Olympics
Freestyle skiers at the 2006 Winter Olympics
Universiade bronze medalists for Russia
Universiade medalists in freestyle skiing
Competitors at the 2009 Winter Universiade